Tigist Moreda (born 1968) is an Ethiopian former long-distance runner. She competed in the women's 10,000 metres at the 1992 Summer Olympics.

References

External links
 

1968 births
Living people
Athletes (track and field) at the 1992 Summer Olympics
Ethiopian female long-distance runners
Olympic athletes of Ethiopia
Place of birth missing (living people)
African Games medalists in athletics (track and field)
African Games bronze medalists for Ethiopia
Athletes (track and field) at the 1991 All-Africa Games
20th-century Ethiopian women
21st-century Ethiopian women